The Brazilian Navy is the naval service branch of the Brazilian Armed Forces, responsible for conducting naval operations. The Brazilian Navy is the largest navy in Latin America and the second largest navy in the Americas after the United States Navy.

The navy was involved in Brazil's war of independence from Portugal. Most of Portugal's naval forces and bases in South America were transferred to the newly independent country.  In the initial decades following independence, the country maintained a large naval force and the navy was later involved in the Cisplatine War, the River Plate conflicts, the Paraguayan War as well as other sporadic rebellions that marked Brazilian history.

By the 1880s the Brazilian Imperial Navy was the most powerful in South America. After the 1893–1894 naval rebellion, there was a hiatus in the development of the navy until 1905, when Brazil acquired two of the most powerful and advanced dreadnoughts of the day which sparked a dreadnought race with Brazil's South American neighbours. The Brazilian Navy participated in both World War I and World War II, engaging in anti-submarine patrols in the Atlantic.

The modern Brazilian Navy includes British-built guided missile frigates (FFG), locally built corvettes (FFL), coastal diesel-electric submarines (SSK) and many other river and coastal patrol craft.

Mission
In addition to the roles of a traditional navy, the Brazilian Navy also carries out the role of organizing the merchant navy and other operational safety missions traditionally conducted by a coast guard. Other roles include:
 Conducting national maritime policy
 Implementing and enforcing laws and regulations with respect to the sea and inland waters.

History

Origins
The origins of the Brazilian Navy date back to the Portuguese naval forces based in Brazil. The transfer of the Portuguese monarchy to Brazil in 1808 during the Napoleonic wars also resulted in the transfer of a large part of the structure, personnel and ships of the Portuguese Navy. These became the core of the Navy of Brazil.

Imperial Navy (1822–1889)

War of Independence

The Brazilian Navy came into being with the independence of the country. Some of its members were native-born Brazilians, who under Portuguese rule had been forbidden to serve, while other members were Portuguese born who adhered to the cause of independence and foreign mercenaries. A number of establishments previously created by King João VI of Portugal were incorporated into the navy such as the Department of Navy, Headquarters of the Navy, the Intendancy and Accounting Department, the Arsenal (Shipyard) of the Navy, the Academy of Navy Guards, the Naval Hospital, the Auditorship, the Supreme Military Council, the powder plant, and others. The Brazilian-born Captain Luís da Cunha Moreira was chosen as the first minister of the Navy on 28 October 1822.

British naval officer Lord Thomas Alexander Cochrane was made the commander of the Brazilian Navy and received the rank of "First Admiral".  At that time, the fleet was composed of one ship of the line (Pedro I), four frigates, and smaller ships for a total of 38 warships. The Secretary of Treasury Martim Francisco Ribeiro de Andrada created a national subscription to generate capital in order to increase the size of the fleet. Contributions were sent from all over Brazil. Even Emperor Pedro I acquired a merchant brig at his own expense (renamed Caboclo) and donated it to the Navy.  The navy fought in the north and also south of Brazil where it had a decisive role in the independence of the country.  After the suppression of the revolt in Pernambuco in 1824 and prior to the Cisplatine War, the navy increased significantly in size and strength. Starting with 38 ships in 1822, eventually the navy had 96 modern warships of various types with over 690 cannon.

Cisplatine War and rebellions (1825–1849)

The Navy blocked the estuary of the Río de la Plata hindering the contact of the United Provinces (as Argentina was then called) with the Cisplatine rebels who wanted Uruguay to join Argentina again or become an independent country, and the outside world. Several battles had occurred between Brazilian and Argentine ships, with Irish-born Argentine admiral William Brown temporarily leading a successful campaign, which had included a significant victory at Juncal. Eventually however, a Brazilian fleet led by English admiral James Norton scored a decisive victory near the island of Santiago in mid 1827, rendering the United Provinces navy combat ineffective and ensuring that the blockade would proceed uncontested. The war came to a stalemate and in 1828, Brazil accepted the resolution guaranteeing the independence of Uruguay. When Pedro I abdicated in 1831, he left a powerful navy made up of two ships of the line and ten frigates in addition to corvettes, steamships, and other ships for a total of at least 80 warships in peacetime.
During the 58-year reign of Pedro II the Brazilian Navy achieved its greatest strength in relation to navies around the world.  The Arsenal, Navy department, and the Naval Jail were improved and the Imperial Marine Corps was created. Steam navigation was adopted. Brazil quickly modernized its fleet acquiring ships from foreign sources while also constructing ships locally. Brazil's Navy substituted the old smoothbore cannon for new ones with rifled barrels, which were more accurate and had longer ranges. Improvements were also made in the Arsenals (shipyards) and naval bases, which were equipped with new workshops.  Ships were constructed in the Naval Arsenal of Rio de Janeiro, Salvador, Recife, Santos, Niterói and Pelotas. The Navy also successfully fought against all revolts that occurred during the Regency where it conducted blockades and transported the Army troops; including Cabanagem, Ragamuffin War, Sabinada, Balaiada, amongst others.

When Emperor Pedro II was declared of legal age and assumed his constitutional prerogatives in 1840, the Armada had over 90 warships: six frigates, seven corvettes, two barque-schooners, six brigs, eight brig-schooners, 16 gunboats, 12 schooners, seven armed brigantine-schooners, six steam barques, three transport ships, two armed luggers, two cutters and thirteen larger boats.

During the 1850s the State Secretary, the Accounting Department of the Navy, the Headquarters of the Navy and the Naval Academy were reorganized and improved. New ships were purchased and the ports administrations were better equipped. The Imperial Mariner Corps was definitively regularized and the Marine Corps was created, taking the place of the Naval Artillery. The Service of Assistance for Invalids was also established, along with several schools for sailors and craftsmen.

Platine & Paraguayan wars (1849–1870)

The conflicts in the Platine region did not cease after the war of 1825. The anarchy caused by the despotic Rosas and his desire to subdue Bolívia, Uruguay and Paraguay forced Brazil to intercede.  The Brazilian Government sent a naval force of 17 warships (a ship of the line, 10 corvettes and six steamships) commanded by the veteran John Pascoe Grenfell.  The Brazilian fleet succeeded in passing through the Argentine line of defence at the Tonelero Pass under heavy attack and transported the troops to the theater of operations. The Brazilian Armada had a total of 59 vessels of various types in 1851: 36 armed sailing ships, 10 armed steamships, seven unarmed sailing ships and six sailing transports.
More than a decade later the Armada was once again modernized and its fleet of old sailing ships was converted to a fleet of 40 steamships armed with more than 250 cannons.  In 1864 the navy fought in the Uruguayan War and immediately afterwards in the Paraguayan War where it annihilated the Paraguayan navy in the Battle of Riachuelo. The navy was further augmented with the acquisition of 20 ironclads and six fluvial monitors. At least 9,177 navy personnel fought in the five years' conflict.  Brazilian naval constructors such as Napoleão Level, Trajano de Carvalho and João Cândido Brasil planned new concepts for warships that allowed the country's Arsenals to retain their competitiveness with other nations. All damage suffered by ships was repaired and various improvements were made to them. In 1870, Brazil had 94 modern warships and had the fifth most powerful navy in the world.

Expansion and the end of the Empire (1870–1889)

During the 1870s, the Brazilian Government strengthened the navy as the possibility of a war against Argentina over Paraguay's future became quite real. Thus, it acquired a gunboat and a corvette in 1873; an ironclad and a monitor in 1874; and immediately afterwards two cruisers and another monitor.  The improvement of the Armada continued during the 1880s. The Arsenals of the Navy in the provinces of Rio de Janeiro, Bahia, Pernambuco, Pará and Mato Grosso continued to build dozens of warships. Also, four torpedo boats were purchased.

On November 30, 1883, the Practical School of Torpedoes was created along with a workshop devoted to constructing and repairing torpedoes and electric devices in the Arsenal of Navy of Rio de Janeiro. This Arsenal constructed four steam gunboats and one schooner, all with iron and steel hulls (the first of these categories constructed in the country). Both ships (considered state-of-the-art by experts from Europe) allowed the Brazilian Armada to retain its position as one of the most powerful naval forces. By 1889, the navy had 60 warships and was the fifth or sixth most powerful navy in the world.

In the last cabinet of the monarchic regime, the Minister of the Navy, Admiral José da Costa Azevedo (the Baron of Ladário), left the reorganization and modernization of the navy unfinished.  The coup that ended the monarchy in Brazil in 1889 was not well accepted by the Armada. Imperial Mariners were attacked when they tried to support the imprisoned Emperor in the City Palace. The Marquis of Tamandaré begged Pedro II to allow him to fight back the coup; however, the Emperor refused to allow any bloodshed.  Tamandaré would later be imprisoned by order of the dictator Floriano Peixoto under the accusation of financing the monarchist military in the Federalist Revolution.

The Baron of Ladário remained in contact with the exiled Imperial Family, hoping to restore the monarchy, but ended up ostracized by the republican government. Admiral Saldanha da Gama led the Revolt of the Armada with the objective of restoring the Empire and allied himself with other monarchists who were fighting in the Federalist Revolution. However, all the attempts at restoration were violently crushed. High-ranking Monarchist officers were imprisoned, banished or executed by firing squad without due process of law and their subordinates also suffered harsh punishments.

Early republic (1889–1917)

Naval revolts

The military coup that led to the proclamation of the Brazilian Republic (1889), accentuated the decline of shipbuilding in the country. For four decades, between 1890 and 1930 no new ships were built in Brazil. The focus of republican governments was to equip the army to fight internal uprisings in the new regime's early years. The Navy was perceived as a threat to the new republican regime, as it had been more loyal to the Monarchy.

The situation became precarious in just over a decade as the Naval Battalion was reduced to 295 soldiers and Imperial Marines to 1,904 men. The equipment and vessels acquired were considered outdated by Navy officials, who criticized the abandonment of repair shops.  Naval officers participated in two riots, known as Naval Riots. The second, avowedly monarchist, cost the officers their careers and their lives, without entering the military justice process. The sailors who obeyed orders and took part in the attempt to restore monarchy suffered cruelly.

South American naval rivalry

Brazil's navy fell into disrepair and obsolescence in the aftermath of the 1889 revolution, which deposed Emperor Pedro II, after naval officers led a revolt in 1893–94. Meanwhile, the Argentine and Chilean navies were flush with modern warships after the conclusion of a naval arms race between the two. As a result, at the turn of the 20th century the Brazilian Navy lagged far behind its Argentine and Chilean counterparts in quality and total tonnage.

Rising demand for coffee and rubber brought Brazil an influx of revenue in the early 1900s. Simultaneously, there was a drive on the part of prominent Brazilians, most notably Pinheiro Machado and the Baron of Rio Branco, to have the country recognized as an international power. A strong navy was seen as crucial to this goal. The National Congress of Brazil drew up and passed a large naval acquisition program in late 1904, but it was two years the Minister of the Navy, Admiral Júlio César de Noronha, signed a contract with Armstrong Whitworth for three small battleships.

After construction began, a new presidential administration took office and the new government reconsidered their chosen battleship design. This was wrought by the debut of the United Kingdom's new dreadnought concept, especially its "all-big-gun" armament that utilized many more heavy-caliber weapons than previous battleships. This warship type would have rendered the Brazilian ships obsolete before they were completed.

As a result, the Brazilian government redirected its naval funds towards three dreadnoughts, of which only two would be built immediately. This move was made with the large-scale support of Brazilian politicians, including Pinheiro Machado and a nearly unanimous vote in the Senate; the navy, now with the large-ship advocate Rear Admiral  in the influential post of minister of the navy; and the Brazilian press. It made Brazil was the third country to have a dreadnought under construction, behind the United Kingdom and the United States, and before France, the German Empire, the Russian Empire, and the Empire of Japan. As dreadnoughts were quickly equated with international status, somewhat similar to nuclear weapons today—that is, regardless of a state's need for such equipment, simply ordering and possessing a dreadnought increased the owner's prestige—the order caused a stir in international relations.

This order led to a naval arms race between Brazil, Argentina, and Chile, which was ended only by the advent of the First World War. Brazil's first two dreadnoughts, Minas Geraes and São Paulo, would be delivered in 1910. The third dreadnought was redesigned multiple times in response to advancing naval technology and financial concerns; it would eventually be sold to the Ottoman Empire and serve with the British as HMS Agincourt. A larger super-dreadnought was ordered shortly before the war, but little was accomplished prior to the beginning of the conflict.

Revolt of the Lash

In late 1910, a major rebellion known as the Revolt of the Lash, or Revolta da Chibata, broke out on four of the newest ships in the Brazilian Navy. The initial spark was provided on 21 November when Afro-Brazilian sailor Marcelino Rodrigues Menezes was brutally flogged 250 times for insubordination. Many Afro-Brazilian sailors were sons of former slaves, or were former slaves freed under the Lei Áurea (abolition) but forced to enter the navy. They had been planning a revolt for some time, and Menezes became the catalyst. Further preparations were needed, so the rebellion was delayed until 22 November. The crewmen of Minas Geraes, São Paulo, the twelve-year-old , and the new  quickly took their vessels with only a minimum of bloodshed: two officers on Minas Geraes and one each on São Paulo and Bahia were killed.

The ships were well-supplied with foodstuffs, ammunition, and coal, and the only demand of mutineers—led by João Cândido Felisberto—was the abolition of "slavery as practiced by the Brazilian Navy". They objected to low pay, long hours, inadequate training for incompetent sailors, and punishments including bôlo (being struck on the hand with a ferrule) and the use of whips or lashes (chibata), which eventually became a symbol of the revolt. By 23 November, the National Congress had begun discussing the possibility of a general amnesty for the sailors. Senator Ruy Barbosa, long an opponent of slavery, lent a large amount of support, and the measure unanimously passed the Federal Senate on 24 November. The measure was then sent to the Chamber of Deputies.

Humiliated by the revolt, naval officers and the president of Brazil were staunchly opposed to amnesty, so they quickly began planning to assault the rebel ships. The former believed such an action was necessary to restore the service's honor. Late on 24 November, the President ordered the naval officers to attack the mutineers. Officers crewed some smaller warships and the cruiser , Bahias sister ship with ten  guns. They planned to attack on the morning of 25 November, when the government expected the mutineers would return to Guanabara Bay. When they did not return and the amnesty measure neared passage in the Chamber of Deputies, the order was rescinded. After the bill passed 125–23 and the president signed it into law, the mutineers stood down on 26 November.

During the revolt, the ships were noted by many observers to be well-handled, despite a previous belief  that the Brazilian Navy was incapable of effectively operating the ships even before being split by a rebellion.

World Wars and between wars (1917–1945)

First World War (1917–1918)

After the declaration of war on the Central Powers in October 1917 the Brazilian Navy participated in the war.  On 21 December 1917 the British government requested that a Brazilian naval force of light cruisers be placed under Royal Navy control and a squadron comprising the cruisers Rio Grande do Sul and Bahia, the destroyers Paraíba, Rio Grande do Norte, Piauí, and Santa Catarina, and the support ship Belmonte and the ocean-going tugboat Laurindo Pitta was formed, designated the Divisão Naval em Operações de Guerra ("Naval Division in War Operations"). The DNOG sailed on 31 July 1918 from Fernando de Noronha for Sierra Leone, arriving at Freetown on 9 August, and sailing onwards to its new base of operations, Dakar, on 23 August. On the night of 25 August the division believed it had been attacked by a U-boat when the auxiliary cruiser Belmonte sighted a torpedo track. The purported submarine was depth-charged, fired on, and reportedly sunk by Rio Grande do Norte, but the sinking was never confirmed.
The DNOG patrolled the Dakar–Cape Verde–Gibraltar triangle, which was suspected to be used by U-boats waiting on convoys, until 3 November 1918 when it sailed for Gibraltar to begin operations in the Mediterranean Sea, with the exception of Rio Grande do Sul, Rio Grande do Norte, and Belmonte. The Division arrived at Gibraltar on 10 November; while passing through the Straits of Gibraltar, they mistook three United States Navy subchasers for U-boats but no damage was caused.

The Constitutionalist War (1932)

Initiating the armed uprising in the State of São Paulo in July 1932, one of the first actions of the legalist forces was the blockade of the Port of Santos, the objective being to prevent the São Paulo state insurgents from obtaining supplies and weapons from abroad. The Brazilian Navy formed a fleet of ships led by the cruiser Rio Grande Do Sul, including destroyers Mato Grosso, Pará and Sergipe.

During the Constitutionalist Revolution of 1932, the cruiser Rio Grande do Sul became the first Brazilian Navy ship to shoot down an aircraft, in this case a Constitutionalist Curtiss Falcon on September 24, 1932. Throughout the conflict, the port of Santos was blocked by the Brazilian Navy, making it impossible for the rebels to receive reinforcements there, the naval ships also carried out naval bombardment of the rebel troops stationed there.

Second World War (1942–1945)

Despite U-boat operations in the region (centred in the Atlantic Narrows between Brazil and West Africa) beginning autumn 1940, only in the following year did these start to raise serious concern in Washington. This perceived threat caused the US to decide that the introduction of US forces along Brazil's coast would be valuable. After negotiations with Brazilian Foreign Minister Osvaldo Aranha (on behalf of dictator Getúlio Vargas), these were introduced in second half of 1941.
Germany and Italy subsequently extended their submarine attacks to include Brazilian ships wherever they were, and from April 1942 were found in Brazilian waters.

In World War II, Brazil's navy was obsolete. In early 1942, German submarines aimed to interdict supplies from reaching Britain and the Soviet Union. Between 1942 and 1944, Brazil's navy was supported by the United States Navy. During this period several naval bases were established in the North and Northeast of Brazil, becoming the headquarters of the Allied Command Atlantic South.

Within their limitations and with the refitting and reorganization promoted with American resources, the Brazilian Navy participated actively in the fight against U-boats in the South, Central Atlantic and also the Caribbean. They guarded Allied convoys bound for North Africa and the Mediterranean. Between 1942 and 1945 the navy was responsible for conducting 574 convoy operations protecting 3,164 merchant ships of various nationalities. Enemy submarines managed to sink only three vessels. According to German documentation the Brazilian Navy made over sixty-six attacks against German submarines.

A total of nine U-boats known German submarines were destroyed along the Brazilian coast.

About 1,100 Brazilians died during the Battle of the Atlantic as a result of the sinking of 32 Brazilian merchant vessels and a naval warship. Among the 972 dead from the merchant vessels, 470 were crew and 502 were civilian passengers. Besides these, 99 sailors died in the sinking of Vital de Oliveira when she was attacked by German submarines, in addition to some 350 deaths in accidents that resulted in the sinking of the corvette Camaquã on 21 July 1944. The cruiser Bahia was sunk by an explosion on 4 July 1945 which resulted in the deaths of over 300 men.

Brazilian fleet (1942-1945)

Cold War period (1945–1988)

Lobster War (1961–1963)

Local fishermen complained that large boats were coming from France to catch lobster off the state of Pernambuco, so the Brazilian Admiral Arnoldo Toscano ordered two corvettes to sail to the area where the French fishing boats were located. Seeing that the fishermen's claim was justifiable, the captain of the Brazilian vessel then demanded that the French boats retreat to deeper water, leaving the continental shelf to smaller Brazilian vessels. The situation became very tense once the French rejected this demand and radioed a message asking for the French government to send a destroyer to accompany the lobster boats, which prompted the Brazilian government to put fleet in a state of alert.

The French vessel withdrew after the arrival of a Brazilian warship and the aircraft carrier .

1964 Coup d'état

Although corporal punishment was officially abolished after the Revolt of the Lash, or Revolta da Chibata, at the end of 1910, improvement in working conditions and career plans were still contentious in early 1960. The dissatisfaction with officialdom and conservative politicians, coupled with the lack of vision and inability of the general policy of then president João Goulart, led the sailors, encouraged by leaders such as Corporal Anselmo, to the military coup of 1964.

The purges carried out later (not just the navy but for all the armed forces), and the establishment of certain criteria for selection of its new members were a military term in the Brazilian tradition among its members openly harboring various currents of political thought.

The  Minas Gerais served the Navy until its decommissioning in 2001.

The carrier was commissioned as NAeL Minas Gerais (named for Kubitschek's home state) on 6 December 1960. She departed Rotterdam for Rio de Janeiro on 13 January 1961.

Peacekeeping and SAR missions

Notable search and rescue missions

AFF447 (2009)

Flight 447 was due to pass from Brazilian airspace into Senegalese airspace at approximately 02:20 (UTC) on 1 June, and then into Cape Verdean airspace at approximately 03:45. Shortly after 04:00, when the flight had failed to contact air traffic control in either Senegal or Cape Verde, the controller in Senegal attempted to contact the aircraft. When he received no response, he asked the crew of another Air France flight (AF459) to try to contact AF447; this also met with no success.

The Brazilian Navy also moved three vessels initially, being the patrol vessel Grajaú, the frigate  and the corvette Caboclo to aid in the searches. Subsequently, the tanker  and the frigate Bosisio were sent, increasing the search force of the navy to five boats.

During the search period, 51 bodies were recovered, more than 600 pieces of the aircraft, as well as passengers' luggage. A total of 1,344 officers of the Brazilian Navy and eleven vessels, 35,000 miles, were directly involved in the search, rescue and support.

ARA San Juan (2017)
On 15 November 2017, the submarine San Juan in service with the Argentine Navy, stopped communicating during a routine patrol in the South Atlantic off the coast of Argentina. A multi-nation search operation was mounted to try to locate the submarine, which was believed to have suffered an electrical malfunction. Within hours of San Juans last transmission, reports describe an explosive noise, detected in the vicinity of the vessel's last known location.

The frigate Rademaker, the submarine relief ship NSS Felinto Perry and the polar ship NPo Almirante Maximiano of the Brazilian Navy participated in the multinational search for the lost submarine.

Peacekeeping operations

Haiti

On 28 May 2004 four Brazilian Navy ships departed from Rio de Janeiro bound for Haiti on a peace mission coordinated by the United Nations (UN). The ships transported part of the military contingent that was involved in Haitian reconstruction. In addition to 150 Marines and Army troops, the ships carried most of the materiel for the Brazilian stabilization force — approximately 120 vehicles, 26 trailers of various types, and 81 containers loaded with equipment and supplies. On 28 February 2010, the Brazilian Navy ship  sailed from Rio de Janeiro with 900 tons of cargo, including humanitarian aid supplies to earthquake victims in Haiti as well as equipment for the Brazilian military that operates in that country.

Ammunition was brought for Brazilian soldiers in addition to 14 power generators and 30 vehicles, including trucks, ambulances and armored vehicles.  The ship's crew consisted of 350 mariners.

Lebanon

On 15 February 2011, Brazil assumed command of the Maritime Task Force (MTF) of the United Nations Interim Force in Lebanon (UNIFIL).
On 4 October the Brazilian Ministries of Defence and Foreign Relations informed authorities that Brazil was sending a Navy vessel with up to 300 crew members, equipped with an aircraft, to join the fleet in Lebanon and the vessel was authorized by the National Congress. On 25 November 2011 the frigate União with 239 officers and sailors aboard joined the task force, bringing to nine the number of vessels assisting the Lebanese Navy in monitoring Lebanese territorial waters.
The frigate served as the flagship for Rear Admiral Luiz Henrique Caroli of Brazil who had been Commander of UNIFIL-MTF since February.

On 10 April 2012 the frigate Liberal left Rio de Janeiro bound for Lebanon to join the force. It was relieved in January 2013 by the frigate Constituição which joined a multinational group comprising nine ships; three from Germany, two from Bangladesh, one from Greece, one from Indonesia and one from Turkey. The crew comprised 250 military officials. The return to Rio was scheduled for August 2013.

On 8 August 2015 the corvette Barroso left Rio de Janeiro to replace União and later that month carried out maritime interdiction operations and provided training to the Lebanese Navy. On 4 September 2015 it rescued 220 Syrian migrants in the Mediterranean Sea, as reported by the Ministry of Defense in a statement released on its website. The Brazilian ship was sailing towards Beirut in Lebanon when it received an alert from the Italian Maritime Rescue Coordination Centre (MRCC) about a sinking vessel taking immigrants to Europe.

Combined Task Force 151

On June 9, 2021, the Brazilian Navy assumed command of the Combined Task Force (CTF) 151, a multinational task force to combat piracy and which provides protection for the global maritime trade in an area covering the Arabian Sea, Gulf of Oman, Gulf of Aden, Somali coast and southern Red Sea.

Present

In September 2020, the Brazilian Navy released a new twenty-year strategic plan.

Notable naval battles involving the Brazilian Navy

Brazilian War of Independence 
Battle of 4 May – The largest naval battle of the War of Independence. The Brazilian and Portuguese fleets clashed with inconclusive results.
Siege of Salvador – Brazilian Imperial warships surrounding troops and Portuguese ships in Salvador, Bahia.
Battle of Montevideo – Imperial naval forces sought to capture the last Portuguese redoubt in the Cisplatina province.

Cisplatine War 
Battle of Quilmes - It was a naval battle that began with an attack by the Argentine Navy against the Brazilian imperial squadron, after three hours of combat the naval forces of Brazil defeated the Argentine attack.
Battle of Monte Santiago – The Imperial Navy, commanded by James Norton, surprised and chased an Argentine squad.

Platine War 
Battle of The Tonelero Pass – An Imperial naval force forced passage under an artillery barrage from the Argentine Army.

Uruguayan War 
Siege of Salto – Imperial Navy blockade and bombing of the city of Salto, Uruguay.
Siege of Paysandú – Imperial warships siege and bombard the city of Paysandú.

Paraguayan War 
Battle of Riachuelo – Largest naval battle of the Brazilian Navy history, one of the most important in South America. Involved Brazilian and Paraguayan naval forces.
Battle of Paso de Cuevas – Brazilian and Argentine warships successfully pass Argentine troops at the Cuevas Pass on the Rio Paraná.
Battle of Curuzú – Brazilian Imperial warships bombardment of Curuzú fortifications.
Passage of Curupayty (1867) - Brazilian fleet forces passage under artillery fire at the Paraguayan fortress of Curupaiti.
Siege of Humaitá – Passage of the Imperial fleet before the fortification of Humaitá on the Rio Paraguay.

World War I 
Atlantic anti-submarine campaign – Brazilian squadron created to patrol the area between Dakar-Cape Verde-Gibraltar, during World War I.

World War II 
Battle of the Atlantic – Brazilian warships against German submarines in World War II.

Historic notable ships of the Brazilian Navy

Brazilian Navy today

Personnel
As of 2020, the Brazilian Navy has a reported strength of 80,500 active personnel, of which approximately 16,000 are naval infantry.  The current Navy Commander is Admiral Marcos Sampaio Olsen.

Ships and submarines

As of 2012, the Brazilian Navy had about 100 commissioned ships, with others undergoing construction, acquisition and modernization. Between 1996 and 2005 the Navy retired 21 ships. It was retired in 2017. Its possible replacements are presently in the early stage of planning and are not expected to be in service until at least 2025.

Four Tupi-class and one Tikuna-class Type 209 submarines are in the fleet. The Tupi-class submarines will be upgraded by Lockheed Martin at a cost of $35 million. The modernization includes the replacement of existing torpedoes with new MK 48 units. On 14 March 2008, the Navy purchased four s from France. The Navy is currently developing its first nuclear submarine. The Navy planned to have the Scorpène-class submarines in service in 2017, and their first nuclear-powered submarine commissioned in 2023.

In August 2008 the Navy incorporated the corvette , which was designed and built in Brazil at a cost of $263 million. In August 2012 the Navy requested four new ships based on the Barroso class but using a stealth design.

The PROSUPER program plans to acquire, firstly, five new 6,000-ton frigates, five new offshore patrol vessels and one Logistics Support Vessel.

In January 2012 BAE Systems contracted to supply three patrol vessels that were s. The contract is worth £133m. The offshore patrol vessels are already built, originally ordered by the government of Trinidad and Tobago in a contract which was terminated in 2010. The first vessel was commissioned at the end of June 2012, the second was scheduled for December 2012 and the last for April 2013.
In March 2014, the Brazilian Navy announced plans to domestically build an aircraft carrier, to enter service around 2029. Originally, São Paulo was to be modernized until its introduction, but escalating repair costs forced its retirement in February 2017.  The carrier will likely be based on an existing project and be built with a foreign partner. French company DCNS has a strong presence in Brazil and is already engaged in building five submarines and a naval base in the country. The company has been showcasing their DEAC Aircraft Carrier project based on the carrier 's design and aviation systems including launching conventional take-off aircraft, unmanned aerial vehicle integration, advanced conventional propulsion, and platform stabilization systems. American company General Atomics is marketing their Electromagnetic Aircraft Launch System (EMALS) to Brazil. Possible aircraft to be operated by the carrier may include the Saab Sea Gripen, given that the Air Force has chosen the land-based version as their new jet fighter.

The Brazilian Navy stated in 2018 that they had purchased the helicopter carrier ship  from their British counterparts. Rechristened as PHM Atlântico, this multi-purpose helicopter carrier is presently the flagship of Brazilian Navy.

Current Aircraft

As of 2011, the Naval Aviation arm of the Navy operates around 85 aircraft.  All the aircraft, with the exception of the A-4 Skyhawks, are helicopters.

Current Marines
The Brazilian Marine Corps (Portuguese: Corpo de Fuzileiros Navais; CFN) is the land combat branch of the Brazilian Navy.

Current Brazilian fleet

Future of the Navy

The Navy has a large number of active and planned projects, under the modernization plans of the Brazilian Armed Forces, defined in the National Defense White Paper.

Structure and organisation

Branches

The main branches of the Brazilian Navy are:
 The "Comando de Operações Navais" (Naval Operations Command)
 The "Comando da Força de Superfície" (Surface Force Command)
 The "Comando da Força de Submarinos" (Submarine Force Command)
 The "Comando da Força Aeronaval" (Naval Aviation Force Command)
 The "Comando Geral do Corpo de Fuzileiros Navais" (Marine Corps General Command)
On top of the naval chain of command stands the Commander of the Navy (Comandante da Marinha - CM) with his directly subordinated administrative units. He also relies on the expertise of the Admiralty (Almirantado), which is a collective board without operational functions, but advises the Commander on day to day matters and planning of the service. The Naval Staff (Estado-Maior da Armada - EMA) is the administrative oversight body of the service. The operational forces of the Brazilian Navy are organized in the Naval Operations Command (Comando de Operações Navais - ComOpNav). The structure of the Marinha do Brasil completes with five General Directorates and the Marines General Command. These are support organizations in charge of personnel, supply, navigation infrastructure and other tasks not directly connected to naval combat operations.

Structure

High Command:

COMMANDER OF THE NAVY (Comandante da Marinha - CM)
 Admiralty (Almirantado)
 Naval Staff (Estado-Maior da Armada - EMA)

Naval Operations Command
Naval Operations Command (Comando de Operações Navais - ComOpNav)

National Squadron
 National Squadron Command (Comando-em-Chefe da Esquadra - ComemCh, the oceangoing component of the naval combat forces)
 Surface Force Command (Comando da Força de Superfície - ComForSup)
 1st Escort Squadron Command (Comando do 1º Esquadrão de Escolta - ComEsqdE-1)
 F-41 Defensora(Niterói-class frigate)
 F-42 Constituição (Niterói-class frigate)
 F-43 Liberal (Niterói-class frigate)
 F-44 Independência (Niterói-class frigate)
 F-45 União (Niterói-class frigate)
 2nd Escort Squadron Command (Comando do 2º Esquadrão de Escolta - ComEsqdE-2)
 F-46 Greenhalgh (Greenhalgh class (British Type 22 Batch 1 frigate))
 F-49 Rademaker (Greenhalgh class (British Type 22 Batch 1 frigate))
 V-32 Julio de Noronha (Inhaúma-class corvette)
 V-34 Barroso (Barroso-class (improved Inhaúma-class) corvette)
 1st Support Squadron Command (Comando do 1º Esquadrão de Apoio - ComEsqdAp-1)
 G-28 Mattoso Maia (US Newport-class tank landing ship)
 G-25 Almirante Sabóia (British Round Table-class landing ship logistics)
 G-23 Almirante Gastão Motta (tanker)
 G-40 Bahia (French Foudre-class landing platform dock)
 L-20 Marambaia (general purpose landing craft of Brazilian design)
 U-27 Brasil (training ship (modified Niterói-class frigate))
 U-20 Cisne Branco (training tallship)
 Submarine Force Command (Comando da Força de Submarinos - ComForS)
 S-40 Riachuelo (Riachuelo class)
 S-30 Tupi (Tupi class)
 S-31 Tamoio (Tupi class)
 S-32 Timbira (Tupi class)
 S-33 Tapajó (Tupi class)
 S-34 Tikuna (Tikuna (upgraded Tupi) class)
 K-120 Guillobel (submarine rescue ship)
 Base "Adm. Castro e Silva" (Base Almirante Castro e Silva - BACS)
 Training and Education Center "Almirante Áttila Monteiro Aché" (Centro de Instrução e Adestramento Almirante Áttila Monteiro Aché - CIAMA)
 Combat Divers Groupment (Grupamento de Mergulhadores de Combate - GRUMEC) - the Frogmen special operations unit of the Navy
 Naval Air Forces Command (Comando da Força Aeronaval - ComForAerNav)
 1st Interception and Attack Airplane Squadron (1º Esquadrão de Aviões de Interceptação e Ataque - VF-1)
 1st Anti-Submarine Helicopter Squadron (1º Esquadrão de Helicópteros Anti-Submarino - HS-1)
 1st Reconnaissance and Attack Helicopter Squadron (1º Esquadrão de Helicópteros de Esclarecimento e Ataque - HA-1)
 1st General Purpose Helicopter Squadron (1º Esquadrão de Helicópteros de Emprego Geral - HU-1)
 2nd General Purpose Helicopter Squadron (2º Esquadrão de Helicópteros de Emprego Geral - HU-2)
 1st Helicopter Training Squadron (1º Esquadrão de Helicópteros de Instrução - HI-1)
 1st Remotely-Piloted Aircraft Squadron (1º Esquadrão de Aeronaves Remotamente Pilotadas - QE-1)
 São Pedro da Aldeia Naval Air Base (Base Aérea Naval de São Pedro da Aldeia - BAeNSPA)
 Aerial Naval Training and Education Center (Centro de Instrução e Adestramento Aeronaval - CIAAN)
 São Pedro da Aldeia Quartermaster Center (Centro de Intendência de São Pedro da Aldeia - CeIMSPA)
 São Pedro da Aldeia Naval Policlinic (Policlínica Naval de São Pedro da Aldeia - PNSPA)
 Command of the 1st Naval Division (Comando da 1ª Divisão da Esquadra - ComDiv-1, standing task force staff)
 Command of the 2nd Naval Division (Comando da 2ª Divisão da Esquadra - ComDiv-2, standing task force staff)
 Operational Systems Support Center (Centro de Apoio a Sistemas Operativos - CASOP)
 Rio de Janeiro Naval Base (Base Naval do Rio de Janeiro - BNRJ)
 Training Center "Adm. Marquis de Leão" (Centro de Adestramento Almirante Marques de Leão - CAAML)
 Small Craft Maintenance Center (Centro de Manutenção de Embarcações Miúdas - CMEM)
 Fleet Medical Command (Unidade Médica da Esquadra - UMEsq)

Regional Forces

1st Naval District Command
1st Naval District Command (Comando do 1º Distrito Naval - Com1ºDN) (Rio de Janeiro-RJ)
 Southeastern Naval Patrol Group Command (Comando do Grupamento de Patrulha Naval do Sudeste - ComGptPatNavSE) - patrol flotilla
 Rio de Janeiro Marine Group (Grupamento de Fuzileiros Navais do Rio de Janeiro - GptFNRJ) - marine security battalion
 Rio de Janeiro Naval Radio Transmitter (Estação Rádio da Marinha no Rio de Janeiro - ERMRJ)
 Campos Novos Naval Signals Intelligence Station (Estação Radiogoniométrica da Marinha em Campos Novos - ERMCN)
 Rio de Janeiro Ports Captaincy (Capitania dos Portos do Rio de Janeiro - CPRJ)
 Espírito Santo Ports Captaincy (Capitania dos Portos do Espírito Santo - CPES)
 Espírito Santo School for Seamen Apprentices (Escola de Aprendizes-Marinheiros do Espírito Santo - EAMES)
 Naval Detention Facility Southeast (Presídio da Marinha - PM)

2nd Naval District Command
2nd Naval District Command (Comando do 2º Distrito Naval - Com2ºDN) (Salvador-BA)
 Eastern Naval Patrol Group Command (Comando do Grupamento de Patrulha Naval do Leste - ComGptPatNavL) - patrol flotilla
 Minelaying and Minesweeping Force Command (Comando da Força de Minagem e Varredura - ComForMinVar) - mine warfare ships flotilla
 Salvador Marine Group (Grupamento de Fuzileiros Navais de Salvador - GptFNSa) - marine security battalion
 Salvador Naval Radio Transmitter (Estação Rádio da Marinha em Salvador - ERMS)
 Aratu Naval Base (Base Naval de Aratu - BNA)
 Salvador Naval Quartermaster Center (Centro de Intendência da Marinha em Salvador - CeIMSa)
 Salvador Naval Hospital (Hospital Naval de Salvador - HNSa)
 Bahia Ports Captaincy (Capitania dos Portos da Bahia - CPBA)
 São Francisco do Sul Riverine Captaincy (Capitania Fluvial de São Francisco do Sul - CFSF)
 Sergipe Ports Captaincy (Capitania dos Portos de Sergipe - CPSE)
 Nautical Signalization Service East (Serviço de Sinalização Náutica do Leste - SSN-2)

3rd Naval District Command
3rd Naval District Command (Comando do 3º Distrito Naval - Com3ºDN) (Natal-RN)
 Northeastern Naval Patrol Group Command (Comando do Grupamento de Patrulha Naval do Nordeste - ComGptPatNavNE) - patrol flotilla
 Natal Marine Group (Grupamento de Fuzileiros Navais de Natal - GptFNNa) - marine security battalion
 Natal Naval Signals Intelligence Station (Estação Radiogoniométrica da Marinha em Natal - ERMN)
 Natal Naval Base (Base Naval de Natal - BNN)
 Natal Naval Quartermaster Center (Centro de Intendência da Marinha em Natal - CeIMNa)
 Natal Naval Hospital (Hospital Naval de Natal - HNNa)
 Recife Naval Hospital (Hospital Naval de Recife - HNRe)
 Ceará Ports Captaincy (Capitania dos Portos do Ceará - CPCE)
 Rio Grande do Norte Ports Captaincy (Capitania dos Portos do Rio Grande do Norte - CPRN)
 Paraíba Ports Captaincy (Capitania dos Portos da Paraíba - CPPB)
 Pernambuco Ports Captaincy (Capitania dos Portos de Pernambuco - CPPE)
 Alagoas Ports Captaincy (Capitania dos Portos de Alagoas - CPAL)
 Ceará School for Seamen Apprentices (Escola de Aprendizes-Marinheiros do Ceará - EAMCE)
 Pernambuco School for Seamen Apprentices (Escola de Aprendizes-Marinheiros de Pernambuco - EAMPE)
 Nautical Signalization Service Northeast (Serviço de Sinalização Náutica do Nordeste - SSN-3)

4th Naval District Command
4th Naval District Command (Comando do 4º Distrito Naval - Com4ºDN) (Belém-PA)
 Northern Naval Patrol Group Command (Comando do Grupamento de Patrulha Naval do Norte - ComGptPatNavN) - patrol flotilla
 2nd Riverine Operations Battalion (2º Batalhão de Operações Ribeirinhas - 2ºBtlOpRib) - riverine amphibious marine battalion
 1st Northern General Purpose Helicopter Squadron (1º Esquadrão de Helicópteros de Emprego Geral do Norte (HU-41))
Belém Naval Signals Intelligence Station (Estação Radiogoniométrica da Marinha em Belém - ERMBe)
 Val-de-Cães Naval Base (Base Naval de Val-de-Cães - BNVC)
 Belém Naval Quartermaster Center (Centro de Intendência da Marinha em Belém - CeIMBe)
 Belém Naval Hospital (Hospital Naval de Belém - HNBe)
 Naval Training Center "Adm. Braz de Aguiar" (Centro de Instrução Almirante Braz de Aguiar - CIABA)
 Eastern Amazônia Ports Captaincy (Capitania dos Portos da Amazônia Oriental - CPAOR)
 Amapá Ports Captaincy (Capitania dos Portos do Amapá - CPAP)
 Maranhão Ports Captaincy (Capitania dos Portos do Maranhão - CPMA)
 Piauí Ports Captaincy (Capitania dos Portos do Piauí - CPPI)
 Santerém Riverine Captaincy (Capitaná Fluvial de Santerém - CFS)
 Northern Hydrographic and Navigation Center (Centro de Hidrografia e Navegação do Norte - CHN-4)

5th Naval District Command
5th Naval District Command (Comando do 5º Distrito Naval - Com5ºDN) (Rio Grande-RS)
 Southern Naval Patrol Group Command (Comando do Grupamento de Patrulha Naval do Sul - ComGptPatNavS) - patrol flotilla
 Rio Grande Marine Group (Grupamento de Fuzileiros Navais de Rio Grande - GptFNRG) - marine security battalion
1st Southern General Purpose Helicopter Squadron "Albatross" (1º Esquadrão de Helicópteros de Emprego Geral do Sul (HU-51 "Albatroz"))
 Rio Grande Naval Signals Intelligence Station (Estação Radiogoniométrica da Marinha no Rio Grande - ERMRG)
 Rio Grande Naval Station (Estação Naval do Rio Grande - ENRG)
 Rio Grande Naval Quartermaster Center (Centro de Intendência da Marinha em Rio Grande - CeIMRG)
 Rio Grande Naval Policlinic (Policlínica Naval de Rio Grande - PNRG)
 Santa Catarina Ports Captaincy (Capitania dos Portos de Santa Catarina - CPSC)
 Rio Grande do Sul Ports Captaincy (Capitania dos Portos do Rio Grande do Sul - CPRS)
 Porto Alegre Riverine Captaincy (Capitania Fluvial de Porto Alegre - CFPA)
 Santa Catarina School for Seamen Apprentices (Escola de Aprendizes-Marinheiros de Santa Catarina - EAMSC)
 Southern Nautical Signalization Service (Serviço de Sinalização Náutica do Sul - SSN-5)

6th Naval District Command
6th Naval District Command (Comando do 6º Distrito Naval - Com6ºDN) (Ladário-MS)
 Mato Grosso Flotilla Command (Comando da Flotilha de Mato Grosso - ComFlotMT)
 3rd Riverine Operations Battalion (3º Batalhão de Operações Ribeirinhas - 3ºBtlOpRib) - riverine amphibious marine battalion
 4th General Purpose Helicopter Squadron (4º Esquadrão de Helicópteros de Emprego Geral - HU-4)
1st Western General Purpose Helicopter Squadron "Hawk" (1º Esquadrão de Helicópteros de Emprego Geral do Oeste (HU-61 "Gavião"))
 Ladário Naval Riverine Base (Base Fluvial de Ladário - BFLa)
 Ladário Naval Quartermaster Center (Centro de Intendência da Marinha em Ladário - CeIMLa)
 Ladário Naval Hospital (Hospital Naval de Ladário - HNLa)
 Pantanal Riverine Captaincy (Capitania Fluvial do Pantanal - CFPN)
 Western Nautical Signalization Service (Serviço de Sinalização Náutica do Oeste - SSN-6)

7th Naval District Command
7th Naval District Command (Comando do 7º Distrito Naval - Com7ºDN) (Brasilia-DF)
 Brasília Capital Marine Guards Group (Grupamento de Fuzileiros Navais de Brasília - GptFNB) - marine security and public duties battalion
 Brasília Naval Hospital (Hospital Naval de Brasília - HNBra)
 Brasília Naval Radio Station and Transmitter (Estação Rádio da Marinha em Brasília - ERMB)
 Brasília Naval Training and Education Center (Centro de Instrução e Adestramento de Brasília - CIAB)
 Araguaia-Tocantins Riverine Captaincy (Capitania Fluvial do Araguaia-Tocantins - CFAT)
 Brasília Riverine Captaincy (Capitania Fluvial de Brasília - CFB)

8th Naval District Command
8th Naval District Command (Comando do 8º Distrito Naval - Com8ºDN) (São Paulo-SP)
 South-Southeastern Naval Patrol Group Command (Grupamento de Patrulha Naval do Sul-Suldeste - ComGptPatNavSSE) - patrol flotilla
 São Paulo Marine Group (Grupamento de Fuzileiros Navais em São Paulo - GptFNSP) - marine security battalion
 São Paulo Ports Captaincy (Capitania dos Portos de São Paulo - CPSP)
 Tietê-Paraná Riverine Captaincy (Capitania Fluvial do Tietê-Paraná - CFTP)
 Paraná Ports Captaincy (Capitania dos Portos do Paraná - CPPR)
 Rio Paraná Riverine Captaincy (Capitania Fluvial do Rio Paraná - CFRP)
 Guaíra Riverine Forces Bureau (Delegacia Fluvial de Guaíra - DelGuaira)

9th Naval District Command

9th Naval District Command (Comando do 9º Distrito Naval - Com9ºDN) (Manaus-AM)
 Amazonian Flotilla Command (Comando da Flotilha do Amazonas - ComFlotAM)
 1st Riverine Operations Battalion (Primeiro Batalhão de Operações Ribeirinhas - 1ºBtlOpRib) - riverine amphibious marine battalion
 3rd General Purpose Helicopter Squadron (3º Esquadrão de Helicópteros de Emprego Geral - HU-3)
1st Northwestern General Purpose Helicopter Squadron "Toucan" (1.º Esquadrão de Helicópteros de Emprego Geral do Nordoeste (HU-91 "Tucano"))
 Rio Negro Naval Station (Estação Naval do Rio Negro - ERNR)
 Manaus Naval Quartermaster Center (CeIMMa – Centro de Intendência da Marinha em Manaus - CeIMMa)
 Tabatinga Riverine Captaincy (Capitania Fluvial de Tabatinga - CFT)
 Western Amazônia Riverine Captaincy (Capitania Fluvial da Amazônia Ocidental - CFAOC)
 Manaus Naval Policlinic (Policlínica Naval de Manaus - PNMa)
 Northwestern Nautical Signalization Service (Serviço de Sinalização Náutica do Noroeste - SSN-9)

Fleet Marines Forces Command
 Fleet Marine Forces Command (Comando da Força de Fuzileiros da Esquadra - ComFFE) - the expeditionary component of the Brazilian Marines
 Marine Special Operations Battalion "Tonelero" (Batalhão de Operações Especiais de Fuzileiros Navais - BtlOpEspFuzNav - "Batalhão Tonelero")
 Amphibious Division Command (Comando da Divisão Anfíbia - ComDivAnf)
 Command Battalion (Batalhão de Comando e Controle - BtlCmdoCt)
 1st Marine Battalion "Riachuelo" (1º Batalhão de Infantaria de Fuzileiros Navais - 1ºBtlInfFuzNav - "Batalhão Riachuelo") - motorised
 2nd Marine Battalion "Humaitá" (2º Batalhão de Infantaria de Fuzileiros Navais - 2ºBtlInfFuzNav - "Batalhão Humaitá") - motorised
 3rd Marine Battalion "Paissandu" (3º Batalhão de Infantaria de Fuzileiros Navais - 3ºBtlInfFuzNav - "Batalhão Paissandu") - motorised
 Marine Armored Battalion (Batalhão de Blindados de Fuzileiros Navais - BtlBldFuzNav) - one light tank, one tracked APC and one wheeled APC companies
 Marine Field Artillery Battalion (Batalhão de Artilharia de Fuzileiros Navais - BtlArtFuzNav) - towed artillery and MLRS
 Marine Air Tactical Control and Air Defence Battalion (Batalhão de Controle Aerotático e Defesa Antiaérea - BtlCtAetatDAAe) - MANPADS
 Marine Base Governor's Island (Base de Fuzileiros Navais da Ilha do Governador - BFNIG)
 Reinforcement Troop Command (Comando da Tropa de Reforço - ComTrRef)
 Command HQ
 Marine Combat Engineers Battalion (Batalhão de Engenharia de Fuzileiros Navais - BtlEngFuzNav)
 Nuclear, Biological, Chemical and Radiological Defence Company (Companhia de Defesa Nuclear, Biológica, Química e Radiológica - CiaDefNQBR)
 Marine Amphibious Vehicles Battalion (Batalhão de Viaturas Anfíbias - BtlVtrAnf)
 Landing Support Company (Companhia de Apoio ao Desembarque - CiaApDbq)
 Naval Police Company (Companhia de Polícia - CiaPol)
 Marine Logistics Battalion (Batalhão Logístico de Fuzileiros Navais - BtlLogFuzNav)
 Naval Expeditionary Medical Unit (Unidade Médica Expedicionária da Marinha - UMEM)
 Marine Base Isle of Flowers (Base de Fuzileiros Navais da Ilha das Flores - BFNIF)
 Landing Forces Command (Comando da Tropa de Desembarque - CmdoTrDbq)
 Rio Meriti Marine Base (Base de Fuzileiros Navais do Rio Meriti - BFNRM)

Naval Electronic Warfare Center
Naval Electronic Warfare Center (Centro de Guerra Eletrônica da Marinha - CGEM)

Naval Control Center for Maritime Traffic
Naval Control Center for Maritime Traffic (Comando do Controle Naval do Tráfego Marítimo - COMCONTRAM)

Support Formations

General Secretariat
Office of the Secretariat General of the Navy (Secretaria-Geral da Marinha - SGM)

General Directorate for Material
General Directorate for Material (Diretoria-Geral do Material da Marinha - DGMM)

General Directorate for Personnel
General Directorate for Personnel  (Diretoria-Geral do Pessoal da Marinha - DGPM)

General Directorate for Navigation
General Directorate for Navigation (Diretoria Geral de Navegação - DGN)

General Directorate for Nuclear and Technological Development of the Navy
General Directorate for Nuclear and Technological Development of the Navy (Diretoria-Geral de Desenvolvimento Nuclear e Tecnológico da Marinha - DGDNTM)

Marine Corps General Command
Marine Corps General Command (Comando-Geral do Corpo de Fuzileiros Navais - CGCFN) - the service support formation of the Brazilian Marines
 Marine Materiel Command (Comando do Material de Fuzileiros Navais - CMatFN)
 Naval Battalion Rio de Janeiro (Batalhão Naval - BtlNav) - includes honor guard and military band companies
 Battalion HQ
 Honor Guard Company 
 Military Police Company of the Naval Battalion (Companhia de Polícia do Batalhão Naval - CiaPolBtlNav) - the Brazilian Marines' Military Police, attached to the Naval Battalion
 Central Band of the Marine Corps
 Brazilian Marine Pipes, Drum and Bugle Corps
 Marine Corps Technological Center (Centro Tecnológico do Corpo de Fuzileiros Navais - CTecCFN)
 Marine Corps Personnel Command (Comando do Pessoal de Fuzileiros Navais - CPesFN)
 Marine Basic Training Center "Adm. Sylvio de Camargo" (Centro de Instrução Almirante Sylvio de Camargo - CIASC)
 Marine Basic Training Center "Adm. Milcíades Portela Alves" (Centro de Instrução Almirante Milcíades Portela Alves - CIAMPA)
 Nuclear, Biological, Chemical and Radiological Defence Battalion Itaguaí (Batalhão de Defesa Nuclear, Biológica, Química e Radiológica de Itaguaí - BtlDefNQBR-Itaguaí) - planned to provide NBCR protection on site to the Itaguaí Naval Base (Base Naval de Itaguaí), (in construction as of 2018) the homeport of the Brazilian nuclear submarine force.
 Nuclear, Biological, Chemical and Radiological Defence Battalion ARAMAR (Batalhão de Defesa Nuclear, Química, Biologica e Radiológica de ARAMAR - BtlDefNQBR - ARAMAR) - provides NBCR protection on site to the ARAMAR Experimental Center (Centro Experimental Aramar), where the propulsion systems for Brazil's nuclear submarines are being developed and constructed.
 Nuclear, Biological, Chemical and Radiological Defence Center of the Brazilian Navy (Centro de Defesa Nuclear, Biológica, Quiímica e Radiológica da MB - CDefNBQR-MB) - the Brazilian Navy's nuclear, biological, chemical and radiological defence center of excellence 
 Naval Sports Commission (Comissão de Desportos da Marinha - CDM)
 Naval Physical Training Center "Adm. Adalberto Nunes" (Centro de Educação Física Almirante Adalberto Nunes - CEFAN)
 Marine Doctrine Development Command (Comando do Desenvolvimento Doutrinário do Corpo de Fuzileiros Navais - CDDCFN)
 Ilha do Marambaia Marine Training Center (Centro de Adestramento da Ilha da Marambaia - CADIM)

Naval bases

As of 2009, the main naval bases in use are:
 Rio de Janeiro:
 "Base Naval Almirante Castro e Silva", submarine base
 "Base Naval do Rio de Janeiro", main naval base
 "Arsenal da Marinha do Rio de Janeiro", naval shipyard
 "Base Aérea Naval de São Pedro da Aldeia", naval aviation base
 "Base de Fuzileiros Navais da Ilha do Governador", marine corps base
 "Base de Fuzileiros Navais da Ilha das Flores", marine corps base
 "Base de Fuzileiros Navais do Rio Meriti", marine corps base
 Bahia:
 "Base Naval de Aratu", naval base and repair facility
 Rio Grande do Norte:
 "Base Naval de Natal", naval base
 "Base Naval Almirante Ary Parreiras", naval base and repair facility
 Pará:
 "Base Naval de Val-de-Cães", naval base and repair facility
 Mato Grosso do Sul:
 "Base Fluvial de Ladário", riverine naval base, heliport and repair facility
 Amazonas:
 "Estação Naval do Rio Negro", riverine naval station and repair facility
 Rio Grande do Sul:
 "Estação Naval do Rio Grande", naval station

See also

 Armed Forces of the Empire of Brazil
 Imperial Brazilian Navy
 Naval Revolt
 Brazilian Marine Corps
 Brazilian Naval Aviation
 Brazilian Army
 Brazilian Air Force
 Military history of Brazil
 Military ranks of Brazil
 Brazil and weapons of mass destruction
 List of Brazilian Ministers of the Navy
 Submarine Development Program

Notes

References

Sources
 
 
 
 
 
 

 
 .
 .
 
 
 .
 .
 
 .
 .
 .
 
 .
 .
 .
 
 
 .

External links

 Brazilian Navy Official website 
  Poder Naval Brazilian warships and naval aviation 
 Official histories of Brazilian ships 
 Global Security Brazilian Navy profile
 History of World's Navy's Ships of the Brazilian Navy
 History of VF-1 "Falcões" (Hawks) in the Brazilian Navy
 Brazilian naval flags
 Base Militar Web Magazine's Brazilian military aircraft data base
  Military Orders and Medals from Brazil

Videos
 Brazilian Navy A-4 Skyhawks